The following is a timeline of the history of the city of Cali, Colombia.

Prior to 20th century

1536 – Cali founded by Spaniard Sebastián de Belalcázar.
1747 –  (church) built.
1802 –  built.
1810
July 3: Cali declares independence from Spanish colonial rule.
Population: 6,385.
1811 – Cali joins the Confederated cities of the Cauca Valley.
1890 – Market Plaza built (approximate date).

20th century

1906 - Population: 16,000 (estimate).
1910 – Catholic Diocese of Cali, regional administrative Valle del Cauca Department, and Cali Chamber of Commerce Quiénes somos I Cámara de Comercio de Cali established.
1912 – Deportivo Cali (sport club) formed.
1914 – Buenaventura-Cali railway begins operating.
1927 –  opens.
1931 –  (theatre) opens.
1933 –  built.
1937 – Estadio Olímpico Pascual Guerrero (stadium) opens.
1938 – Population: 88,366.
1942 –  (church) rebuilt.
1945 – University of Valle established.
1946 – October: Economic unrest.
1950 – El País newspaper begins publication.
1951 – Population: 284,186.
1953
 (railway station) opens.
 (library) established.
1956
Dynamite explosion.
La Tertulia Museum founded.
1957
Cali Fair begins.
 opens.
1968 –  established near city.
1969 – Cali Zoo founded.
1970
Universidad Autónoma de Occidente established.
Pontifical Xavierian University begins operating in Cali.
1971
Palmaseca Airport, Coliseo El Pueblo (arena) and Velódromo Alcides Nieto Patiño open.
1971 Pan American Games held in Cali.
1973 – Population: 898,253 city; 923,264 urban agglomeration.
1974 – Central de Transportes de Cali built.
1977 – Criminal Cali Cartel active.
1979 – Universidad Icesi founded.
1980
 shopping center opens.
Procali NGO association established.
1984 – Cali Tower built.
1985 – Population: 1,369,331.
1990
 built.
 established.
1992
 becomes mayor.
Population: 1,759,139.
1995
December 20: Airplane crash in nearby Buga.
 (book fair) begins.
1996 – El Gato del Río sculpture erected at Avenida del Río.
1999 – Church kidnapping.

21st century

2001 – Jardin Botanico de Cali (garden) established.
2002 – April 12: Valle del Cauca Deputies hostage crisis begins.
2004 – Criminal Los Rastrojos active.
2005 – Population: 2,119,908.
2007 – Centro de Eventos Valle del Pacifico built.
2008 –  film museum opens.
2009 – Masivo Integrado de Occidente (transit system) begins operating.
2010 – Estadio Deportivo Cali (stadium) opens.
2016 – Population: 2,394,925.
2017 – Starbucks begins operations.

See also
Cali history

Other cities in Colombia:
Timeline of Bogotá
Timeline of Cartagena, Colombia
Timeline of Ocaña, Colombia

References

This article incorporates information from the Spanish Wikipedia and French Wikipedia.

Bibliography

 (about Bogota, Cali, Medellin)

External links

Map of Cali, 1981
Map of Cali, 1995

.
cali
Cali
Cali
Years in Colombia